Lucia Cadotsch (born 23 February 1984 in Zürich) is a Swiss singer with jazz background.

Biography 
Cadotsch received vocal and a classical piano education at a young age. She studied jazz singing at the Universität der Künste Berlin and at the Rytmisk Musikkonservatorium in Copenhagen. She used the voice as a versatile instrument and thus developed her vocal style.

Cadotsch has toured internationally with the band Schneeweiss & Rosenrot and has released three albums since 2009. With Petter Eldh  and the saxophonist Otis Sandsjö she formed the project Speak Low. With the American Ukulele and fiddler Manon Kahle as well as Ronny Graupe, Uli Kempendorff and Michael Griener, she interprets classic country songs as Yellow Bird Countrysongs and in 2015 released the album Sing. Furthermore, she performs in the trio with Christian Weidner and Kathrin Pechlof, and in the electronics project Liun. She also works with Hayden Chisholm and the Lucerne Jazz Orchestra and can be heard with Super 700 (Under the No Sky).

Her brother Silvio Cadotsch (b. 1985) is a jazz trombonist.

Honors 
 2009: Awarded the Grand Prize in the first National Singing Competition New Voices
 2012: Recipient of the New German Jazz Prize with 'Schneeweiss & Rosenrot
 2017: Awarded an Echo Jazz for her album Speak Low

Discography

Solo albums 
 2016: Speak Low (Enja/Yellowbird)

Collaborations 
With Schneeweiss & Rosenrot
 2009: Salt Crusted Dreams (Calibrated Music)
 2011: Pretty Frank (Enja)
 2012: Pool (Enja)

With Yellow Bird
 2015: Sing (Enja)

References

External links 
 
 Lust des Erreichten Die Zeit 20 December 2014
 

1984 births
Living people
Swiss jazz composers
Swiss jazz singers
Musicians from Zürich
21st-century Swiss women singers
Women jazz composers
Enja Records artists